My Aunt's Theory is a comedy film directed by Akram Farid. The film stars Lebleba and Hassan Al Radad (who plays three different characters), and follows a woman trying to attract the attention of the host of the talk show that she edits.

Plot 
The movie follows a young lady on a search for the perfect man, according to her aunt's theory on love and relationships. She finally falls in love with a famous TV program presenter, but their problems begin due to his fame and the growing number of his female fans.

References

External links 

 

Egyptian comedy films
2010s Arabic-language films
2013 comedy films